Dan Joye (born February 19, 1985) is a Venezuelan-born American luger who has competed since 1995. Competing in two Winter Olympics, he earned his best finish of sixth in the men's doubles event at Vancouver in 2010.

Joye's best finish at the FIL World Luge Championships was sixth in the men's doubles event twice (2005, 2009).

Joye resides in San Jose, California and partnered with former singles luger Christian Niccum for the 2007-08 World Cup season.

He was married June 28, 2008 to Jennifer Marie Turner of San Jose, California.

References

FIL-Luge profile
USA Luge.org profile of Niccum & Joye 
US Olympic Committee profile

External links 
 
 
 
 

1985 births
Living people
American male lugers
Olympic lugers of the United States
Lugers at the 2006 Winter Olympics
Lugers at the 2010 Winter Olympics
Sportspeople from San Jose, California
People from Anzoátegui